"You Ain’t Thinking (About Me)" is a song recorded by the American soul group Sonia Dada. It was released on January 31, 1993, as the group's second single from their debut studio album and peaked at number three on the Australian ARIA Singles Chart, number 19 on the New Zealand Singles Chart, and number 68 on the Canadian RPM Top Singles chart. It was certified Gold in Australia for sales exceeding 35,000 copies.

Track listings
Australian 7-inch single
A. "You Ain't Thinking (About Me)" (radio edit)
B. "You Don't Treat Me No Good"

Australasian CD and cassette single
 "You Ain't Thinking (About Me)" (radio edit)
 "You Ain't Thinking (About Me)" (album version)
 "I Live Alone"
 "You Don't Treat Me No Good" (Ebersold/Paige remix)
 "You Don't Treat Me No Good" (Krampf remix)

Charts

Weekly charts

Year-end charts

Certifications

References

1992 songs
1993 singles
Festival Records singles
Sonia Dada songs